Kung Fu Finger Book is a 1979 Hong Kong film directed by Ke Kao with Min Kyu Choi, Amy Chum, Ke Kao. It is also called Kung Fu Fever and Black Dragon Fever.  It stars Dragon Lee and Ron van Clief.

Plot
There is a book with the deadly finger style of the late Bruce Lee.

External links

1979 films
Hong Kong action drama films
1970s Hong Kong films